Dom Gualdim Pais (1118 – 13 October 1195), a Portuguese crusader, Knight Templar in the service of Afonso Henriques of Portugal. He was the founder of the city of Tomar.

Biography
Gualdim Pais was born in Amares (a town in the province of Minho, near Braga) in 1118, son of Paio Ramires and Gontrode Soares. He fought alongside Afonso Henriques against the Moors, and received a knighthood by him in 1139, after the Battle of Ourique.

He departed for Palestine shortly thereafter, and during the next five years fought as a Knight Templar. He had a prominent role in the siege of the city of Gaza. He also fought in the Siege of Ascalon; in sieges and battles around  Sidon and Antioch, and other campaigns of the Zengid–Crusader and Fatimid-Cruzader wars, against the Sultans of Egypt and Syria.

He was ordained the fourth Grand Master in Portugal of the Order of Knights Templar in 1157, which then was ruled from Braga. He founded the Castle of Tomar in 1160, then near the frontier with the Muslim states, and transferred the seat of the order there. The famous Round Church of the Castle of Tomar, inspired by similar structures in Jerusalem, was built under his supervision. He issued a feudal charter (foral), to the town of Tomar in 1162. During his life, he supervised the building or restoration of several other frontier castles for the Templars: the Almourol, Idanha, Ceres, Monsanto and Pombal (founding the settlement of Pombal and issuing a foral in 1174).

Besieged in 1190 by vastly superior forces under the Almohad King of Morocco Yusuf I, he and his knights managed to defeat the monarch's forces, thus defending the north of the fledgling Kingdom.

He died in Tomar in the year 1195. His grave is located in the Church of Santa Maria do Olival in that city.

References

Sources
 

1118 births
1195 deaths
People from Amares
People of the Reconquista
Portuguese city founders
Portuguese knights
Medieval Knights Templar members
12th-century Portuguese people
Amares
Christians of the Second Crusade
Knights Templar